Wang Xiwen was a Chinese police officer and mass murderer who killed seven people and wounded twelve others in Handan, People's Republic of China on November 17, 1980, before being arrested. He was sentenced to death in a public trial on June 10, 1981 and executed immediately afterwards.

Life
Wang, a Han Chinese, was a policeman at the Sucao (苏曹) police station of the Handan municipal public security subbureau, and was promoted to brigade militia company commander and vice chairman of the brigade revolutionary committee. He was said to have become resentful when he lost the latter position, because he and his wife Hao Jinfang (郝金芳) did not adhere to the family planning policy.

Wang, who was also a member of the Communist Party of China, was a follower of Lin Biao and the Gang of Four, advocated their policies and criticized the leaders of the Communist Party after the third plenum of the Central Committee in 1978.

Shooting
In the evening of November 17, 1980, just days before the upcoming trials of the members of the Gang of Four, Wang broke into the office of deputy director Song Tiefa (宋铁法) and director Li Qingsheng (李庆生), pried open a drawer and stole a pistol, 25 rounds of ammunition, CN¥200, and 300 pounds of ration stamps. The 32-year-old policeman then destroyed a ceramics bust of Mao Zedong, as well as portraits of Marx, Engels, Lenin, Stalin, Mao, Zhou Enlai, and Zhu De by firing eleven rounds.

Subsequently, Wang broke into the armory of the second brigade in the north of Handan, where he armed himself with a light machine gun, eight rifles, 28 hand grenades, and a total of 2,700 rounds of ammunition. For the next six hours he paced through the streets of Handan, shooting people and throwing grenades, and repeatedly returned to the armory in between to restock his arms supply. When he was finally arrested Wang had spent 460 rounds and detonated 26 grenades, leaving six people dead at the scene, one more fatally wounded, and twelve others injured, five of them seriously. He had also killed two pigs and damaged two television sets, as well as a transformer.

Victims
Among those killed were:
 Guo Huimin (郭会民), temporary worker
 Guo Qingxuan (郭清选), member of Sucao second brigade
 Li Fushan (李付善), factory worker
 Li Liuzhu (李留柱), captain of Sucao second brigade
 Lu Yingkui (路英奎), miner

Trial and execution
After the investigation of the crime by the Handan City Public Security Bureau was completed the case was transferred to the Handan Prefectural Intermediate People's Court on January 13, 1981. Prosecution began on January 21, but due to insufficient evidence the case was returned to the Handan Procuratorate on February 20.

After an additional investigation the case was again transferred to the Handan Prefectural Intermediate People's Court on March 26, and on April 9, 1981 Wang was sentenced to death for counterrevolutionary activities and deprived of his political rights for life. Wang filed an appeal against the verdict, claiming that he had been insane at the time, and so the case was transferred to the Hebei Provincial Higher People's Court on April 21, which sent Wang to a psychiatric hospital in Baoding for examination, where he was eventually found to be legally sane. On May 9 the judicial committee decided to maintain Wang's conviction, and on May 13 the case was transferred to the Supreme People's Court to review the verdict, which was approved on May 26.

The conviction was thus upheld by the Handan Prefectural Intermediate People's Court, as well as the Handan Municipal People's Court in a public trial at the Handan Municipal Stadium on June 10. Immediately after his appeal was dismissed Wang was blindfolded, bound to a pole and executed by a firing squad in front of a crowd of 50,000 people.

References

1940s births
1981 deaths
Mass murder in 1980
20th-century Chinese criminals
20th-century executions by China
Chinese male criminals
Executed People's Republic of China people
People convicted of murder by the People's Republic of China
People executed by China by firing squad
Chinese people convicted of murder
Chinese mass murderers
Executed mass murderers
Police officers convicted of murder
Executed Chinese people
Police officers executed for murder
20th-century mass murder in China
Mass shootings in China
1980 murders in China